The burzinqa is a turban worn by Mandaean men during baptismal ceremonial rituals. It forms the upper end of a lengthy piece of cloth, with the lower end making up the pandama or mouth-veil.

In the Qolasta

Several prayers in the Qolasta are recited when putting on the burzinqa, including prayers 1, 3, and 5.

See also

 Mandaean priest#Clothing
 Pandama

References

External links
Tying the turban and the sacred belt
Tying the turban (video)
Tying the turban (video)

Religious headgear
Mandaean clothing
Turbans